The 2009 Australian Open Grand Prix was a badminton tournament which took place at the Melbourne Sports and Aquatic Centre in Melbourne, Australia on 22–26 July 2009 and had a total purse of $50,000.

Men's singles

Seeds

 Chan Yan Kit (semifinals)
 Andre Kurniawan Tedjono (second round)
 Lee Tsuen Seng (second round)
 Andrew Smith (third round)
 Brice Leverdez (quarterfinals)
 Anup Sridhar (quarterfinals)
 Anand Pawar (second round)
 Matthieu Lo Ying Ping (quarterfinals)

Finals

Women's singles

Seeds

 Yip Pui Yin (final)
 Maria Febe Kusumastuti (champion)
 Kristína Ludíková (semifinals)
 Anita Raj Kaur (semifinals)
 Neha Pandit (quarterfinals)
 Michelle Chan (first round)
 Karen Foo Kune (withdrew)
 Lê Ngọc Nguyên Nhung (first round)

Finals

Men's doubles

Seeds

  Rupesh Kumar K. T. / Sanave Thomas (final)
  Gan Teik Chai / Tan Bin Shen (champion)
  Akshay Dewalkar / Jishnu Sanyal (semifinals)
  Tarun Kona / Arun Vishnu (semifinals)

Finals

Women's doubles

Seeds

  Danielle Barry / Donna Haliday (semifinals)
  Chan Tsz Ka / Tse Ying Suet (quarterfinals)
  Aparna Balan / Shruti Kurien (final)
  Amanda Brown / Susannah Leydon-Davis (second round)

Finals

Mixed doubles

Seeds

  Yohan Hadikusumo Wiratama / Chau Hoi Wah (champion)
  Henry Tam / Donna Haliday (final)
  Joe Wu / Danielle Barry (semifinals)
  Arun Vishnu / Aparna Balan (second round)
  Oliver Leydon-Davis / Emma Chapple (quarterfinals)
  Luke Charlesworth / Mary O'Connor (first round)
  Brock Matheson / Amanda Brown (first round)
  Kevin Dennerly-Minturn / Louise McKenzie (first round)

Finals

References

External links
 Tournament link

Australian Open (badminton)
Australia
Badminton Australian Open
Australian Open